Kathleen Hermosa Orille (born April 21, 1981) is a Filipino actress. She is the sister of Kristine Hermosa and sister-in-law of Oyo Boy Sotto.

Filmography

References

External links
 

Filipino television actresses
Living people
Actresses from Manila
1981 births